Patrick H. Adkins (January 9, 1948 – April 7, 2015) was an American fantasy author and editor best known for his mythological fantasies.

In addition to his writing he has worked as "a bookseller, small press publisher, 'slush pile' reader for Galaxy magazine, medical and technical editor and writer, freelance writer, story doctor, ghost writer, editor-in-chief of a multimedia publishing company, and software expert." Together with fellow science fiction fan John H. Guidry he launched the "Tarzana Project" to print the unpublished and uncollected works of Edgar Rice Burroughs under the imprint of Guidry & Adkins.

Bibliography

Titan series
Lord of the Crooked Paths (1987)
Master of the Fearful Depths (1989)
Sons of the Titans (1990)

Other novels
The Third Beast (2000)

Short stories
"Hunting the Dragonblood" (1981)

Footnotes

External links
Adkins's "Strange Excursions" website

Patrick H. Adkins entry at Fantastic Fiction

1948 births
2015 deaths
20th-century American novelists
20th-century American male writers
American fantasy writers
American male novelists
Writers from New Orleans